Ólafía Hrönn Jónsdóttir (born 7 December 1962) is an Icelandic actress. She is known for her role as Freyja in Trapped.

Early life 
Ólafía was born in Reykjavík, Iceland in 1962. She grew up in Reykjavík, and in Hornafjörður where her father managed a bank. She was a scout when she was young and would play sketches for them whenever she got a chance. She graduated from Fjölbrautaskólinn í Ármúla in 1983 and went straight to Theater School (now a division under the Iceland Academy of the Arts)

Career 
Ólafía graduated from the Icelandic Theater School in 1987. She has acted in several stage productions for the National Theater of Iceland and other theaters. She received an Edda Award for her role in Brúðguminn.

Personal life 
In 2011 Ólafía worked with the Red Cross and professional chefs to produce a 12 episode cooking show showing cheap meal options for four-person families. All the meals cost under 2000 ISK (approx. 15 US Dollars).

Filmography 
 Áramótaskaup 1989 (1989) various roles
 SSL-25 (Short) (1990)
 Skýjahöllin (1994) as Inga
 Áramótaskaup 1996 (1996) various roles
 Perlur og Svín (1997) as Lísa
 Áramótaskaup 1997 (1997) various roles
 Áramótaskaup 2000 (2000) various roles
 Áramótaskaup 2001 (2001) various roles
 Litla lirfan ljóta (animated short) (2002) as the bee
 Stella í framboði (2002) as Ágústa kvennremba
 Stormviðri (2003) Guðrún
 Síðasti bærinn (Short) (2004) as the daughter
 Allir litir hafsins eru kaldir (TV-series) as Margrét
 Mýrin (2006) as Elínborg
 Brúðguminn (2008) as Sísí
 Skrapp út (2008)
 Dagvaktin (TV-series) (2008) as Gugga
 Forsthaus Falkenau (TV-series) (2009) as Bürgermeisterin
 Bjarnfreðarson (2009) as Guðbjörg Jónsdóttir
 Mamma Gógó (2010) as the director's sister
 Sumarlandið (2010) as Lára
 Fiskar á þurru landi (TV-movie) (2010) as Efemía
 Grafir & Bein (2016) as Hulda
 Ófærð (TV-series) (2015-2016) as Freyja, Hjörtur's mother
 Black Mirror (Episode: "Crocodile") (2017) as Felicity Carmichael

External links

References 

Living people
1962 births
Ólafía Hrönn Jónsdóttir
Ólafía Hrönn Jónsdóttir
Ólafía Hrönn Jónsdóttir
Ólafía Hrönn Jónsdóttir
Ólafía Hrönn Jónsdóttir